Dacrydium medium is a species of conifer in the family Podocarpaceae. It is found in Indonesia and Malaysia.

References

medium
Least concern plants
Taxonomy articles created by Polbot
Taxa named by David John de Laubenfels